Taiwan has long been a destination for foreign learners of Mandarin and is home to many Mandarin language schools.  Several schools also offer courses in Minnan, or less commonly Hakka and Cantonese. Below is a list of Mandarin language schools in Taiwan:

See also
Scholarships in Taiwan
Huayu Enrichment Scholarship

References

Chinese language
Chinese-language education